Uwe Schenker (born 24 March 1959 in Bremen) is a former West German handball player who competed in the 1984 Summer Olympics.

He was a member of the West German handball team which won the silver medal. He played one match and scored seven goals.

References 
 
 
 profile

1959 births
Living people
German male handball players
Handball players at the 1984 Summer Olympics
Handball-Bundesliga players with retired numbers
Olympic handball players of West Germany
Olympic silver medalists for West Germany
Olympic medalists in handball
Medalists at the 1984 Summer Olympics
Sportspeople from Bremen